The 2013 Dublin Senior Hurling Championship is the 124th staging of the Dublin Senior Hurling Championship since its establishment in 1887. The championship is scheduled to end on 10 November 2013.

Kilmacud Crokes were the defending champions, however, they were defeated in the quarter-final stage. Lucan Sarsfields and Ballyboden St. Enda's contested the final, with Ballyboden winning the game.

Results

Quarter-finals

Semi-finals

Final

References

Dublin Senior Hurling Championship
Dublin Senior Hurling Championship